James Matlack (January 11, 1775January 16, 1840) born in Woodbury, New Jersey, was a Representative from New Jersey.

January 11, 1775; attended the common schools; interested in various business enterprises; owned slaves; justice of the peace in 1803, 1808, 1813, 1816, and 1820; surrogate in 1815; chairman of the township committee; judge of the court of common pleas of Gloucester County 1806–1817; member of the board of freeholders 1812–1815, 1819–1821, and 1828; member of the New Jersey Legislative Council in 1817 and 1818; elected as a Democratic-Republican to the Seventeenth Congress and reelected as an Adams-Clay Democratic-Republican to the Eighteenth Congress (March 4, 1821 – March 3, 1825); was not a candidate for renomination in 1824; affiliated with the Whig Party when it was formed; resumed business interests; died in Woodbury, New Jersey, January 16, 1840; interment in Eglington Cemetery, Clarksboro, New Jersey.

References 

 public domain website of Bioguide of US Congress.

1775 births
1840 deaths
People from Woodbury, New Jersey
People of colonial New Jersey
Members of the New Jersey Legislative Council
Democratic-Republican Party members of the United States House of Representatives from New Jersey
Burials in New Jersey
American slave owners
New Jersey Whigs
Politicians from Gloucester County, New Jersey
19th-century American politicians